The Biggest Fan  is a French film directed by Philippe Guillard in 2021. It was screened at the French comedy festival the 22nd January 2022 L'Alpe d'Huez Film Festival . It will have a cinema release in France the 18 May 2022.

Plot
As Gérard Lanvin prepares to shoot one of the most important films of his career, in the south of France, his path crosses that of Momo Zapareto... to his greatest regret. Because Momo, is not just a fan, but a huge fan! For Gérard, the nightmare has only just begun...

Cast
 Gérard Lanvin : lui-même
  Artus (humoriste) : Momo
 Antoine Bertrand : Bob Martel
 Antony Hickling : Tony Williams
  Caroline Bourg
  Lou Chauvain : l'Assistante de Gérard Lanvin
 Laura del Sol 
 Natasha Andrews

References

External links
 

French comedy films
2022 films
2022 comedy films
2020s French-language films
2020s French films